Wesertal is a municipality in the district of Kassel, in Hesse, Germany. It was created with effect from 1 January 2020 by the merger of the former municipalities of Wahlsburg and Oberweser. It takes its name from the river Weser, that flows through the municipality.

References

Kassel (district)